There's No Me Without You is the fifth studio album by the American vocal group The Manhattans, released in 1973 through Columbia Records.

Chart performance
The album peaked at No. 19 on the R&B albums chart. It reached No. 150 on the Billboard 200. The title track peaked at No. 3 on the Hot Soul Singles chart and No. 43 on the Billboard Hot 100. "You'd Better Believe It" charted at No. 18 on the Hot Soul Singles chart and No. 77 on the Billboard Hot 100. "Wish That You Were Mine" reached No. 19 on the Hot Soul Singles chart.

Track listing

Personnel
Norman Harris, Bobby Eli, Roland Chambers – guitar
Lenny Pakula – organ
Vincent Montana Jr. – vibraphone
Ronnie Baker – bass
Earl Young – drums
Larry Washington – congas
Don Renaldo – horn and string section

Charts
Album

Singles

References

External links
 

1973 albums
The Manhattans albums
Albums produced by Bobby Martin
Albums arranged by Bobby Martin
Albums recorded at Sigma Sound Studios
Columbia Records albums